OL Reign is an American soccer club founded in 2012 as Seattle Reign FC. The club is an inaugural member of the National Women's Soccer League (NWSL) and began playing in the 2013 NWSL season.

This list includes all players who have made at least one competitive appearance for OL Reign. Playing statistics are correct , and they are updated once a year after the conclusion of the NWSL season.

Appearances and goals

References

Lists of soccer players by club in the United States
 
Washington (state) sports-related lists
Lists of women's association football players
Lists of American sportswomen
Association football player non-biographical articles